Michael Wernick (born September 1957) is a Canadian retired public servant who served as the 23rd clerk of the Privy Council for Canada from 2016 to 2019. Following his tenure as clerk, Wernick joined the University of Ottawa, where he was named Jarislowsky chair of public sector management.

Wernick joined the public service in 1981. Before becoming clerk, Wernick was the deputy clerk under Janice Charette. He was previously the deputy minister for the Department of Indian Affairs and Northern Development from May 2006 to July 11, 2014. He has held several other positions in the Privy Council Office and as associate deputy minister for the Department of Canadian Heritage.

Personal life
Born in Montreal, Quebec, Wernick attended Nelson High School in Burlington, Ontario, graduating in 1975. Wernick graduated with a Bachelor of Arts in 1979 and a Master of Arts in economics in 1980 from the University of Toronto. He has been a member of the board of governors for Carleton University in Ottawa. He is a recipient of the Queen Elizabeth II Diamond Jubilee Medal.

He and his wife adopted both of their two children, and wrote about meeting his son's biological mother in 2011.

Wernick's parents immigrated from the United Kingdom in August 1956, landing in Montreal and moving on to Sault Ste. Marie, Ontario in 1959. Wernick attended Queen Elizabeth Public School and Alexander Muir Public School in Sault Ste.Marie in the 1960s and John T. Tuck Public School and Nelson High School in Burlington in the 1970s.

His sister is Rachel Wernick, a senior official at Employment and Social Development Canada responsible for skills training and youth programs, who was one of the key figures in the WE charity controversy that unfolded after his departure.

Career 
Wernick worked at the constitutional affairs unit of the Federal Provincial Relations Office from 1991 to 1993 and in its successor unit when the Office was merged into the Privy Council Office in 1993, leaving in the summer of 1996. Wernick was deeply involved in the process leading up the Charlottetown Accord of August 1992, supporting the Cabinet Committee chaired by Joe Clark and chairing the multi-jurisdiction committee that drafted the political accord. He was the Assistant Secretary, Constitutional Affairs at Privy Council Office in the period leading to and including the 1995 Quebec referendum on secession.

From 1996 to 2002, Wernick was an assistant deputy minister at the Department of Canadian Heritage. He worked on cultural policy issues, including disputes surrounding Canadian cultural protectionism, such as surrounding film policy, copyright, and the trade dispute with the United States regarding the Canadian government's excise tax on "split-run" magazines (where a title whose main edition is published in another country, such as Time Magazine or Sports Illustrated, is republished in Canada with a few pages of special Canadian content, in order to take advantage of Canadian advertising sales revenues), as well as the entry of Amazon into the Canadian book market and music policy in the face of disruption of traditional industry practices by the  internet. In 2002 his first appointment at the deputy minister level was as associate deputy minister at Canadian Heritage.

In 2003 he returned to the Privy Council Office as deputy secretary, where he supported the transition from Prime Minister Jean Chrétien to Paul Martin and later from Martin to Stephen Harper in 2006. Wernick attended the last meeting of the Chrétien Cabinet, the first and last meetings of the Martin Cabinet and the first meeting of the Harper Cabinet.

In May 2006 Wernick was appointed deputy minister for the Department of Indian and Northern Affairs, where he remained for eight years.

On March 18, 2019, Wernick announced that he would be retiring from his position as the clerk of the Privy Council amid the SNC-Lavalin affair. He retired from the federal public service on April 18, 2019.

Controversies

University tuition protest email exchange 
Wernick was criticized for his comments made in an email among Carleton University board of Governors members regarding a university student tuition protest that disrupted and prevented the March 30, 2015 meeting of the Board from continuing. In the private email exchange which was leaked to the media by one of the Board members, he deplored the tactics as authoritarian, similar to those used by brown shirts and Maoists to intimidate their political opponents by disrupting gatherings and physically preventing the meeting from proceeding. This was reported in social media as labelling the protesting students as Nazis. The New Democratic Party called for Wernick to apologize for the comments, and the school's graduate student association called for Wernick to resign. Wernick was later elected to serve as Vice Chair of the Board of Governors for the 2016-17 term and the Board of Governors defeated a motion tabled in September 2016 to revisit the controversy.

SNC-Lavalin Affair 

On February 7, 2019, The Globe and Mail published an article that spurred investigation into the SNC-Lavalin Affair. The article claimed that the Prime Minister's Office had pressured Jody Wilson-Raybould while she was Attorney General of Canada into pursuing a deferred prosecution agreement for SNC-Lavalin. The article also claimed that Wernick had rebuked Wilson-Raybould for having suggested that politicians had engaged in doublespeak on Indigenous issues. Wilson-Raybould resigned her current post as Minister of Veterans Affairs on February 12, 2019.

Wernick appeared before the House of Commons Justice Committee on February 21, 2019, where he disputed the allegations of undue pressure on Wilson-Raybould and stated that The Globe and Mail article contained errors and unfounded speculation. Wilson-Raybould testified on February 27 that Wernick was among those who had placed undue pressure on her and that Wernick had made "veiled threats" to her. This led to calls by opposition parties for Wernick's resignation. Wernick appeared at the Justice Committee for a second time on March 6 where he stated in his testimony that he had made no threats and had raised public interest considerations. Wernick announced his retirement in a letter to the prime minister on March 18. A secretly recorded telephone call between Wernick and Wilson-Raybould was released on March 29 wherein Wernick told Wilson-Raybould that Prime Minister Trudeau wanted a deferred prosecution agreement for SNC-Lavalin "one way or another". Wernick retired on April 19, 2019 and was succeeded by Ian Shugart.

On March 10, 2020, Ethics Commissioner Mario Dion, released his report on an allegation of conflict of interest against Wernick that had been referred to his office by the Public Sector integrity Commissioner. In the report Dion concluded "I do not have any reason to believe Mr. Wernick may have contravened section of the Act on the basis of the alleged facts. I will, therefore, not initiate an examination under section 45 of the Act and consider the matter closed."

Post-retirement

Governing Canada 
In October 2021, Wernick published a book titled Governing Canada; A Guide to the Tradecraft of Politics. Wernick described it as a "how to" rather than a tell-all style book, describing his audience as prospective politicians, public servants and academics.

Academic roles 
From August 2020 to June 2022, Wernick was a fellow and adjunct professor at Carleton University's School of Public Policy and Administration. In May 2022, the University of Ottawa announced that he would take up an appointment as the Jarislowsky Chair in Public Sector Management on July 1, 2022. Wernick has contributed articles on a range of topics to Policy Options, Canadian Government Executive, Global Government Forum and was interviewed for articles by the Globe and Mail, Hill Times, OMNItv, CTVTV, RadioCanada and Journal de Montreal.

References

External links
Official biography

Clerks of the Privy Council (Canada)
Living people
University of Toronto alumni
1957 births